The 2014 Kentucky Wildcats baseball team represented the University of Kentucky in the 2014 NCAA Division I baseball season.  The Wildcats played their home games in Cliff Hagan Stadium. The team was coached by Gary Henderson, who was in his sixth season at Kentucky.

Consensus All-American A. J. Reed (pitcher - first baseman) won numerous awards: Golden Spikes Award, Dick Howser Trophy, SEC Player of the Year, and John Olerud Award (two-way player).

Roster

Schedule

! style="background:#0133a0;color:white;"| Regular Season: 32–22
|- valign="top" 

|- bgcolor="#ddffdd"
| 1 || February 14 || No. 12 Virginia ||  || Brooks Field || W 8–3 || Reed (1–0) || Waddell (0–1) || none ||  || 1–0 || –
|- bgcolor="#ddffdd"
| 2 || February 15 || @  ||  || Brooks Field || W 10–4 || Shepherd (1–0) || Ramsey (0–1) || none || 1,513 || 2–0 || –
|- align="center" bgcolor="#ffdddd"
| 3 || February 16 || VMI ||  || Brooks Field || L 9–10 || Thomas (1–0) || Strecker (0–1) || none ||  || 2–1 || –
|- align="center" bgcolor="#ffdddd"
| 4 || February 17 || @  ||  || Cleveland S. Harley Baseball Park || L 6–8 || Mitchell (1–0) || Zeigler (0–1) || Samples (1) || 117 || 2–2 || –
|- bgcolor="#ddffdd"
| 5 || February 21 ||  ||  || Bud Metheny Baseball Complex || W 16–2 || Reed (2–0) || Carter (0-1) || none ||  || 3–2 || –
|- bgcolor="#ddffdd"
| 6 || February 22 || @ Old Dominion ||  || Bud Metheny Baseball Complex || W 7–5 || Combs (1–0) || Ali (0–1) || none || 772 || 4–2 || –
|- bgcolor="#ddffdd"
| 7 || February 23 ||  ||  || Bud Metheny Baseball Complex || W 13–0 || Cody (1–0) || McCormick (0–1) || none ||  || 5–2 || –
|- bgcolor="#ddffdd"
| 8 || February 25 ||  ||  || Cliff Hagan Stadium || W 7–1 || Salow (1–0) || Braun (0–1) || none || 1,469  || 6–2 || –
|- bgcolor="#bbbbbb"
| 9 || February 26 ||  ||  || Cliff Hagan Stadium ||colspan=7|Canceled
|- bgcolor="#ddffdd"
| 10 || February 28 ||  ||  || Cliff Hagan Stadium || W 8–2 || Reed (3–0) || Andrews (1–1) || none || 1,461 || 7–2 || –
|-

|- bgcolor="#ddffdd"
| 11 || March 1 || Eastern Michigan ||  || Cliff Hagan Stadium || W 9–5 || Shepherd (2–0) || Russell (0–1) || none ||  || 8–2 || –
|- bgcolor="#ddffdd"
| 12 || March 1 || Eastern Michigan ||  || Cliff Hagan Stadium || W 13–2 || Cody (2–0) || Land (0–1) || none || 1,668 || 9–2 || –
|- bgcolor="#ddffdd"
| 13 || March 5 ||  || No. 23 || Cliff Hagan Stadium || W 7–0 || Dwyer (1–0) || Walsh (1–2) || none ||  || 10–2 || –
|- bgcolor="#ddffdd"
| 14 || March 5 || Cincinnati || No. 23 || Cliff Hagan Stadium || W 11–4 || Jack (1–0) || Walker (0–2) || none || 1,460 || 11–2 || –
|- align="center" bgcolor="#ffdddd"
| 15 || March 7 ||  || No. 23 || Cliff Hagan Stadium || L 8–1010 || Bautista (1–0) || Combs (1–1) || none || 1,911 || 11–3 || –
|- bgcolor="#ddffdd"
| 16 || March 8 || Ball State|| No. 23 || Cliff Hagan Stadium || W 24–1 || Shepherd (3–0) || Baker (1–2) || none || 2,091 || 12–3 || –
|- bgcolor="#ddffdd"
| 17 || March 9 || Ball State || No. 23 || Cliff Hagan Stadium || W 26–3 || Nelson (1–0) || Manering (1–2) || none || 1,596 || 13–3 || –
|- align="center" bgcolor="#ffdddd"
| 18 || March 11 || @ Indiana || No. 21 || Bart Kaufman Field || L 2–7 || Hart (2–1) || Dwyer (1–1) || none || 2,746 || 13–4 || –
|- bgcolor="#bbbbbb"
| 19 || March 12 || || No. 21 || Cliff Hagan Stadium ||colspan=7|Canceled
|- align="center" bgcolor="#ffdddd"
| 20 || March 14 || @ Alabama || No. 21 || Sewell-Thomas Stadium || L 0–3 || Turnbull (2–1) || Reed (3–1) || none || 4,258 || 13–5 || 0–1
|- bgcolor="#ddffdd"
| 21 || March 15 || @ Alabama || No. 21 || Sewell-Thomas Stadium || W 7–2 || Shepherd (4–0) || Kamplain (2–2) || none ||  || 14–5 || 1–1
|- align="center" bgcolor="#ffdddd"
| 22 || March 15 || @ Alabama || No. 21 || Sewell-Thomas Stadium || L 3–510 || Burrows (3–0) || Salow (1–1) || none || 4,142 || 14–6 || 1–2
|- bgcolor="#ddffdd"
| 23 || March 18 ||  ||  || Cliff Hagan Stadium || W 10–3 || Mahar (1–0) || Bartley (2–2) || none || 1,633 || 15–6 || 1–2
|- bgcolor="#ddffdd"
| 24 || March 21 || No. 1 South Carolina ||  || Cliff Hagan Stadium || W 13–5 || Reed (4–1) || Montgomery (3–2) || none || 1,937 || 16–6 || 2–2
|- bgcolor="#ddffdd"
| 25 || March 22 || No. 1 South Carolina ||  || Cliff Hagan Stadium || W 2–1 || Shepherd (5–0) || Wynkoop (4–1) || Salow (1) || 2,220 || 17–6 || 3–2
|- align="center" bgcolor="#ffdddd"
| 26 || March 23 || No. 1 South Carolina ||  || Cliff Hagan Stadium || L 3–8 || Crowe (5–0) || Nelson (1–1) || Seddon (7) || 1,870 || 17–7 || 3–3
|- bgcolor="#ddffdd"
| 27 || March 26 || || No. 17 || Cliff Hagan Stadium || W 9–6 || Cody (3–0) || Astle (1–2) || Jack (1) || 1,424 || 18–7 || 3–3
|- bgcolor="#ddffdd"
| 28 || March 28 || @ No. 5 Vanderbilt|| No. 17 || Hawkins Field || W 4–2 || Reed (5–1) || Beede (4–3) || Cody (1) || 2,545 || 19–7 || 4–3
|- align="center" bgcolor="#ffdddd"
| 29 || March 29 || @ No. 5 Vanderbilt|| No. 17 || Hawkins Field || L 3–9 || Miller (6–1) || Shepherd (5–1) || none || 2,885 || 19–8 || 4–4
|- align="center" bgcolor="#ffdddd"
| 30 || March 30 || @ No. 5 Vanderbilt|| No. 17 || Hawkins Field || L 2–6 || Ferguson (5–0) || Nelson (1–2)  || Fulmer (8) || 2,869 || 19–9 || 4–5
|-

|- bgcolor="#ddffdd"
| 31 || April 1 || No. 8 Louisville || No. 21 || Cliff Hagan Stadium || W 8–3 || Dwyer (2–1) || Rogers (0–1) || Jack (2) || 3,742 || 20–9 || 4–5
|- bgcolor="#ddffdd"
| 32 || April 4 || No. 12 Florida || No. 21 || Cliff Hagan Stadium || W 17–1 || Reed (6–1) || Hanhold (3–3) || none || 2,133 || 21–9 || 5–5
|- align="center" bgcolor="#ffdddd"
| 33 || April 5 || No. 12 Florida || No. 21 || Cliff Hagan Stadium || L 10–11 || Shore (3–1) || Shepherd (5–2) || Puk (1) || 1,992 || 21–10 || 5–6
|- bgcolor="#ddffdd"
| 34 || April 6 || No. 12 Florida || No. 21 || Cliff Hagan Stadium || W 9–8 || Dwyer (3–1) || Poyner (3–3) || Cody (2) || 1,920 || 22–10 || 6–6
|- align="center" bgcolor="#ffdddd"
| 35 || April 8 ||  || No. 18 || Cliff Hagan Stadium || L 4–6 || Schneider (2–2) || Combs (1–2) || none || 1,618 || 22–11 || 6–6
|- align="center" bgcolor="#ffdddd"
| 36 || April 11 || Missouri || No. 18 || Cliff Hagan Stadium || L 7–8 || Williams (2–1) || Jack (1–1) || Steele (8) || 1,950 || 22–12 || 6–7
|- bgcolor="#ddffdd"
| 37 || April 12 || Missouri || No. 18 || Cliff Hagan Stadium || W 12–0 || Dwyer (4–1) || Miles (2–4) || none || 2,458 || 23–12 || 7–7
|- align="center" bgcolor="#ffdddd"
| 38 || April 13 || Missouri || No. 18 || Cliff Hagan Stadium || L 3–8 || Anderson (2–2) || Nelson (1–3) || Steele (9) || 2,063 || 23–13 || 7–8
|- bgcolor="#ddffdd"
| 39 || April 15 || @Louisville ||  || Jim Patterson Stadium || W 4–2 || Salow (2–1) || Rogers (0–2) || Cody (S) || 2,597 || 24–13 || 7–8
|- bgcolor="#ddffdd"
| 40 || April 18 || @  ||  || Olsen Field at Blue Bell Park || W 6–3 || Reed (7–1) || Ray (4–3) || Cody (4) || 4,339 || 25–13 || 8–8
|- bgcolor="#ddffdd"
| 41 || April 19 || @ Texas A&M ||  || Olsen Field at Blue Bell Park || W 11–4 || Dwyer (5–1) || Mengden (2–6) || none || 5,311 || 26–13 || 9–8
|- align="center" bgcolor="#ffdddd"
| 42 || April 20 || @ Texas A&M || No. 21 || Olsen Field at Blue Bell Park || L 2–14 || Long (5–1) || Nelson (1–4) || none || 3,308 || 26–14 || 9–9
|- bgcolor="#ddffdd"
| 43 || April 22 ||  || No. 21 || Cliff Hagan Stadium || W 15–13 || Jack (2–1) || Tolle (3–1) || Cody (5) || 1,830 || 27–14 || 9–9
|- align="center" bgcolor="#ddffdd"
| 44 || April 25 || No. 12 Ole Miss || No. 21 || Cliff Hagan Stadium || W 12–4 || Ellis (6–0) || Reed (7–2) || none || 2,247 || 27–15 || 9–10
|- align="center" bgcolor="#ffdddd"
| 45 || April 26 || No. 12 Ole Miss || No. 21 || Cliff Hagan Stadium || L 5–18 || Trent (6–0) || Dwyer (5–2) || Weathersby (1) || 2,474 || 27–16 || 9–11
|- align="center" bgcolor="#ffdddd"
| 46 || April 27 || No. 12 Ole Miss || No. 21 || Cliff Hagan Stadium || L 6–9 || Massie (3–2) || Salow (2–2)  || none || 2,380 || 27–17 || 9–12
|-

|- bgcolor="#ddffdd"
| 47 || May 1 || @  ||  || Lindsey Nelson Stadium || W 15–1 || Reed (8–2) || Martin (3–3) || none || 1,894 || 28–17 || 10–12
|- align="center" bgcolor="#ffdddd"
| 48 || May 2 || @ Tennessee ||  || Lindsey Nelson Stadium || L 2–8 || Williams (5–4) || Dwyer (5–3) || Serrano (1) || 2,089 || 28–18 || 10–13
|- align="center" bgcolor="#ffdddd"
| 49 || May 3 || @ Tennessee ||  || Lindsey Nelson Stadium || L 1–5 || Cox (4–1) || Nelson (1–5)  || none || 1,991 || 28–19 || 10–14
|- bgcolor="#ddffdd"
| 50 || May 9 || ||  || Cliff Hagan Stadium || W 6–3 || Reed (9–2) || Dedrick (1–3) || Jack (3) || 2,239 || 28–19 || 11–14
|- align="center" bgcolor="#ffdddd"
| 51 || May 10 || Auburn ||  || Cliff Hagan Stadium || L 1–8 || Ortman (9–3) || Shepherd (5–3) || none || 2,492 || 29–20 || 11–15
|- bgcolor="#ddffdd"
| 52 || May 11 || Auburn ||  || Cliff Hagan Stadium || W 6–510 || Jack (3–1) || Tella (0–1) || none || 2,279 || 30–20 || 12–15
|- align="center" bgcolor="#ffdddd"
| 53 || May 13 ||  ||  || Brooks Stadium || L 3–412 || Lollar (1–1) || Salow (2–3) || none || 502 || 30–21 || 12–15
|- bgcolor="#ddffdd"
| 54 || May 15 || @  ||  || Foley Field || W 13–0 || Reed (10–2) || Lawlor (4–6) || none || 2,003 || 31–21 || 13–15
|- bgcolor="#ddffdd"
| 55 || May 16 || @ Georgia ||  || Foley Field || W 10–0 || Nelson (2–5) || Sosebee (1–4) || none || 1,933 || 32–21 || 14–15
|- align="center" bgcolor="#ffdddd"
| 56 || May 17 || @ Georgia ||  || Foley Field || L 10–11 || Tyler (6–4) || Brown (0–1) || Cheek (3) || 2,507 || 32–22 || 14–16

|-
! style="background:#0133a0;color:white;"| Post-Season: 5–3
|-

|- bgcolor="#ddffdd"
| 57 || May 20 || vs. (8) Alabama || (9) || Hoover Met || W 7–1 || Reed (11–2) || Eicholtz (3–2) || Nelson (1) ||  || 33–22 || 1–0
|- bgcolor="#ddffdd"
| 58 || May 21 || vs. (1) No. 11 Florida || (9) || Hoover Met || W 4–2 || Cody (4–0) || Shore (7–3) || Shepherd (1) ||  || 34–22 || 2–0
|- bgcolor="#ddffdd"
| 59 || May 22 || vs. (5) No. 17 Mississippi State || (9) || Hoover Met || W 7–612 || Jack (4–1) || Brown (4–3) || none || 8,501 || 35–22 || 3–0
|- align="center" bgcolor="#ffdddd"
| 60 || May 24 || vs. (1) No. 11 Florida || (9) || Hoover Met || L 5–6 || Hanhold (4–3) || Shepherd (5–4) || none || 8,116 || 35–23 || 3–1
|- align="center"

|- align="center"  bgcolor="#ffdddd"
| 61 || May 30 || vs. (3)  || (2) No. 26 || Jim Patterson Stadium || L 6–10 || Drew (10-4) || Shepherd (5-5) || none || 2,365 || 35–24 || 0–1
|- bgcolor="#ddffdd"
| 62 || May 31 || vs. (4)  || (2) No. 26 || Jim Patterson Stadium || W 4–2 || Reed (12–2) || Fasola (2–2) || none || 2,258 || 36–24 || 1–1
|- bgcolor="#ddffdd"
| 63 || June 1 || vs. (3) Kansas || (2) No. 26 || Jim Patterson Stadium || W 8–6 || Brown (1–1) || Kahana (4–7) || Jack (4) || 2,275 || 37–24 || 2–1
|- align="center"  bgcolor="#ffdddd"
| 64 || June 1 || @ (1) No. 12 Louisville || (2) No. 26 || Jim Patterson Stadium || L 1–4 || Rogers (3–3) || Salow (2–4) ||  Burdi (16) || 4,319 || 37–25 || 2–2
|-

| 2014 Kentucky Wildcats Baseball Schedule

See also
Kentucky Wildcats baseball

References

External links
 Kentucky Baseball official website

Kentucky Wildcats
Kentucky Wildcats baseball seasons
Kentucky
Kentucky Wild